The Smyth River is a river of the West Coast Region of New Zealand's South Island. It is an upper tributary of the Wanganui River, which it meets to the west of Mount Whitcombe.

See also
List of rivers of New Zealand

References

Rivers of the West Coast, New Zealand
Rivers of New Zealand
Westland District